Miu Chu (16 December 1981 – 3 July 2022) was a Taiwanese singer. She was the winner of the third season of the Taiwanese reality television show Super Idol.

Chu performed at the Kaohsiung lantern festival in a concert on 12 February 2011. She has also performed at Legacy Taipei. On 5 January 2021, while promoting her final full-length album released in late December 2020, Chu announced she was battling breast cancer. Her family confirmed via Facebook on 3 July 2022 that Chu died at the age of 40 after a two-year battle with the disease.

References

External links 

 http://weibo.com/miu1216 Miu Chu's Weibo 
 

1981 births
2022 deaths
21st-century Taiwanese singers
Taiwanese Mandopop singer-songwriters
Taiwanese Hokkien pop singers
Taiwanese people of Hakka descent
People from Hsinchu County
Hakka musicians
21st-century Taiwanese women singers
Deaths from breast cancer
Deaths from cancer in Taiwan